Wildflower is the fourteenth album led by saxophonist Hank Crawford and his third released on the Kudu label in 1973.

Reception

AllMusic awarded the album 4 stars stating "Wildflower is indispensable as a shining example of '70s groove jazz at its best".

Track listing
 "Corazón" (Carole King) – 6:03
 "Wildflower" (Doug Edwards, David Richardson) – 3:57
 "Mr. Blues" (Hank Crawford) – 6:07
 "You've Got It Bad Girl" (Stevie Wonder, Yvonne Wright) – 9:37
 "Good Morning Heartache" (Irene Higginbotham, Ervin Drake, Dan Fisher) – 6:07

Personnel 
Hank Crawford – alto saxophone
Bernie Glow – trumpet, flugelhorn
Alan Rubin, Marvin Stamm – trumpet
Tony Studd – trombone, bass trombone
Wayne Andre, Paul Faulise – trombone
Jimmy Buffington, Brooks Tillotson – French horn
Richard Tee – electric piano, organ 
Joe Beck – electric guitar
Bob Cranshaw – bass, electric bass
Idris Muhammad – drums
Rubens Bassini, George Devens, Dave Friedman, Arthur Jenkins, Phil Kraus, Ralph MacDonald – percussion
Hilda Harris, Maeretha Stewart, Randy Peyton, Bill Eaton – vocals (track 2)
Bob James – arranger, conductor

References 

1973 albums
Hank Crawford albums
Kudu Records albums
Albums produced by Creed Taylor
Albums recorded at Van Gelder Studio